The East River Bridge is a multi-span bridge in Sheet Harbour, Nova Scotia that carries Trunk 7 and the Marine Drive scenic route over the Northeast Arm of Sheet Harbour. It was opened on December 17, 2015 to pedestrians, with a bridge walk commemorating the closing of the old bridge and the opening of the new bridge. The bridge was opened to vehicles the day after. It replaced a green steel arch bridge of the same name that was built in 1956 immediately north of the current bridge. Nova Scotia was considering repairs to the old bridge, but they ultimately elected to construct a new bridge instead. The current bridge was designed without overhead arches, unlike its predecessor, as the construction cost would have been doubled.

History

The predecessor to the current bridge was located in Sheet Harbour, in the eastern area of the Halifax Regional Municipality, along the Eastern Shore. It was a green steel arch bridge, and was built in 1956 over the Northeast Arm of Sheet Harbour. It had a half-through, two-hinge type arch, as well as a built-up box-cross section for support. The bridge had engineering ties with the Angus L. MacDonald Bridge in Halifax. The deck carried the two lanes of Trunk 7 and by extension the Marine Drive scenic route, and was hung from the arch by vertical steel wide flange shape hangers. The ribs of the bridge were heavily reinforced in 1988. As the bridge neared the end of its lifespan, it was replaced by a new bridge with the same name. Unlike the old bridge, the new bridge was designed without overhead steel arches that would have doubled the cost.

Construction
Construction of the $19 million bridge began in September 2014. The Nova Scotia Government contributed $11.8 million to the project, with the remaining $7.2 million coming from the Government of Canada. The new bridge relies on two pillars set in the granite below the Northeast Arm. They were built with a technique which involved drilling steel pipes into the riverbed, then surrounding them with concrete and steel, instead of installing cofferdams, which would be more costly and would disrupt the river. Near completion, a deck, railings and sidewalks, were laid. It is built on the same site as the old bridge's predecessor, which was constructed in 1907. Unlike the old bridge, the new bridge was designed without overhead steel arches that would have doubled the cost. Overall, the structure is  wider than the old bridge. It includes a wider shoulder for cyclists. Several modifications were made to the roads on the Sheet Harbour side, near the bridge. Trunk 7 was aligned with what was previously Riverside Drive, which is now non-existent. Church Point Road and Pool Road were aligned to the new Trunk 7. The access road to and Duncan MacMillan High School was slightly modified. A minor loop called Sprott Lane was extended along a part of the old Trunk 7 for a few households. There is no toll to access the bridge.

The bridge opened on 17 December 2015, with a bridge walk, in which Sheet Harbour residents walked across the old bridge to commemorate its closure, then walked back across the new bridge signifying its opening. That same day, the new bridge was opened for pedestrians, and open to traffic the following day. The new bridge has a projected lifespan of at least 75 years, until 2090. It also has a sidewalk, which connects to Sheet Harbour's current sidewalk system. Officials hope this will encourage active transportation.

The old East River Bridge was closed immediately after the bridge walk and demolition was completed in early September 2016.

See also

References

External links
East River Bridge replacement article
Chronicle Herald article on the new bridge

Buildings and structures in Halifax, Nova Scotia
Road bridges in Nova Scotia
Transport in Halifax, Nova Scotia
Bridges completed in 1956
Bridges completed in 2015